Ali Mohammad Momeni (born 22 January 1937) is an Iranian wrestler. He competed in the men's freestyle 78 kg at the 1968 Summer Olympics.

References

External links
 

1937 births
Living people
Iranian male sport wrestlers
Olympic wrestlers of Iran
Wrestlers at the 1968 Summer Olympics
People from Gorgan